The Gambian Creole people, or Krio or Aku, are a minority ethnic group of Gambia with connections to and roots from the Sierra Leone Creole people. In Gambia the Aku account for about 2% of the population. Some estimates put the figure higher. However, according to the 2013 Gambian Census, the Aku make up 0.5% of the population or around 8,477 people.

Origins
Gambian Creoles are the descendants of Sierra Leoneans of Nova Scotian, Jamaican Maroon and Liberated African ancestry, who migrated to the Gambia, along with liberated Africans released in the Gambia directly.

Gambian Creoles are partly an extension of the Sierra Leone Creole community, and some Gambian Creoles have roots in the West Indies, North America, England, and various African communities. Some Gambian Creoles also have some European heritage through intermarriage and through their connections to Sierra Leone Creoles who settled in the Gambia between the late nineteenth and early twentieth centuries.

Language

Many Gambian Creoles speak the Krio language, an English-based creole also spoken by Sierra Leonean Creoles.

Aku Marabouts
In Sierra Leone, the term 'Aku Marabout' or 'Aku Mohammedan' refers to the Oku people, while in the Gambia, the term 'Aku' refers to the Creole people, who are Christians residing mainly in and around Banjul. The Aku Marabout people of the Gambia are a non-Creole migrant community descended from the Oku people of Sierra Leone.

Notable Gambian Creole people
This is a list of notable Gambian Creole people.

Belinda Bidwell, first female speaker of the National Assembly of The Gambia 
Mark Bright, sports correspondent and former footballer
Crispin Grey-Johnson, current Secretary of State for Higher Education of the Gambia
Augusta Jawara (née Mahoney), was a nurse, playwright, women's rights activist and former first lady
Julia Dolly Joiner, politician and Commissioner of Political Affairs for the African Union
Florence Mahoney, author, historian, and first Gambian woman to be awarded a PhD
Basiru Mahoney, lawyer and Judge
Dej Mahoney, legal and business consultant
Louise N'Jie, teacher, feminist and first woman to serve as a cabinet minister in The Gambia
Lenrie Peters, surgeon, novelist, poet and educationist 
Edward Francis Small, trade unionist, nationalist and pan-Africanist
Susan Waffa-Ogoo, politician and former Minister of Foreign Affairs
 John Carew

References

Sources
http://today.gm/hi/arts/the_aku.html
http://www.accessgambia.com/information/aku.html

African-American diaspora in Africa
People of Sierra Leone Creole descent
Ethnic groups in the Gambia
Repatriated Africans
Gambian Creole people
People of Gambian Creole descent
People of Liberated African descent
Gambian people
Gambian Christians